Monoplex tranquebaricus, common name: the West African hairy triton,  is a species of predatory sea snail, a marine gastropod mollusk in the family Cymatiidae.

Description
The shell size varies between 21 mm and 80 mm.

Distribution
This species is distributed in European waters, in the Atlantic Ocean along the Canary Islands, Cape Verde, West Africa, Gabon, Angola and in the Caribbean Sea and the Gulf of Mexico and the Florida Keys.

References

 Bernard, P.A. (Ed.) (1984). Coquillages du Gabon [Shells of Gabon]. Pierre A. Bernard: Libreville, Gabon. 140, 75 plates

External links
 

Cymatiidae
Gastropods described in 1816
Molluscs of the Atlantic Ocean
Molluscs of Angola
Molluscs of the Canary Islands
Gastropods of Cape Verde
Invertebrates of Gabon